Heterotheca mexicana is a rare Mexican species of flowering plant in the family Asteraceae. It has been found only in western Durango in northeastern Mexico.

References

mexicana
Flora of Durango
Endemic flora of Mexico
Plants described in 1984